The Methodist Episcopal Church South  in Greenup, Kentucky, is a historic church on Greenup's Main Street. It was built in 1845 and added to the National Register of Historic Places in 1988.

It was deemed notable "as good example of the sensitivity of the church congregation to the changing national [architectural] styles. A Greek Revival church building was updated in the 1870s to the Gothic Revival style."

The church was built in 1845.  It was modified in 1876, including by the addition of a square bell tower.

References

Methodist churches in Kentucky
Churches on the National Register of Historic Places in Kentucky
Gothic Revival church buildings in Kentucky
Churches completed in 1845
19th-century Methodist church buildings in the United States
National Register of Historic Places in Greenup County, Kentucky
Southern Methodist churches in the United States
1845 establishments in Kentucky